Christopher Courtis (born 13 February 1994) is a Barbadian swimmer. He competed in the men's 50 metre backstroke event at the 2017 World Aquatics Championships.

References

1994 births
Living people
Barbadian male swimmers
Commonwealth Games competitors for Barbados
Swimmers at the 2014 Commonwealth Games
Pan American Games competitors for Barbados
Swimmers at the 2015 Pan American Games
Place of birth missing (living people)
Male backstroke swimmers